R.L. Stone House, also known as Ithaca, is a historic estate located near Bassett, Henry County, Virginia. It was built between 1930 and 1938, and is a two-story, brick dwelling in the Classical Revival style.  It sits on a full raised basement and has a slate-covered hipped roof. Also on the property are a contributing garage and workshop, stable, and water pump.

It was listed on the National Register of Historic Places in 2006.

References

Houses on the National Register of Historic Places in Virginia
Neoclassical architecture in Virginia
Houses completed in 1938
Houses in Henry County, Virginia
National Register of Historic Places in Henry County, Virginia